Pierella hortona, the white-barred lady slipper, is a species of butterfly of the family Nymphalidae. It is found east of the Andes in Ecuador, Brazil, Peru, and Bolivia. The habitat consists of rainforests and cloud forests at altitudes between 100 and 1600 m.

Adults have a dark brown upperside, with a central patch of blue. Both sexes feed on decomposing fungi and mouldy fruit.

The larvae feed on Heliconia and possibly Calathea species.

Subspecies
Pierella hortona hortona (Brazil: Amazonas, Peru)
Pierella hortona albofasciata Rosenberg & Talbot, 1914 (Peru, Bolivia)

References

Butterflies described in 1854
Haeterini
Fauna of Brazil
Nymphalidae of South America